Miling is a small town in the Shire of Moora,  north of Perth, Western Australia.

Miling is the terminus  of the Clackline–Miling railway branch line 150 miles from Perth. This branch line originally started at Clackline, but  after the changes to the Eastern Railway in 1966  commenced at West Toodyay.

Miling is within the network known as the "wheatbins", which are areas served by the Wheatbelt railway lines of Western Australia.

In 1932, the Wheat Pool of Western Australia announced that the town would have two grain elevators, each fitted with an engine, installed at the railway siding.

The surrounding areas produce wheat and other cereal crops. The town is a receival site for Cooperative Bulk Handling.

Notes

References
 Seymour, A. L. (Amelia L.) (1979) The development of Miling. Miling [W.A.] : A.L. Seymour

Towns in Western Australia
Wheatbelt (Western Australia)
Grain receival points of Western Australia